Utricularia pubescens is a small to medium-sized, probably annual, terrestrial or lithophytic carnivorous plant that belongs to the genus Utricularia and is the only member of Utricularia sect. Lloydia. U. pubescens is native to India, tropical Africa, and Central and South America. It was originally published and described by James Edward Smith in 1819 and placed in its own section, Lloydia, by Peter Taylor in 1986. This species possesses small peltate leaves, which are diagnostic for this species in the genus.

Synonyms 
Utricularia pubescens is an extremely variable species and its distribution covers a large native range, two factors that have led to a considerable amount of synonymy.
[U. capensis Kamieński]
U. connellii N.E.Br.
U. deightonii F.E.Lloyd & G.Taylor
U. fernaldiana F.E.Lloyd & G.Taylor
[U. firmula Hutch. & Dalziel]
U. graniticola A.Chev. & Pellegr.
U. hydrocotyloides F.E.Lloyd & G.Taylor
[U. nivea Afzel. ex Kamieński]
U. papillosa Stapf
[U. pauciflora Afzel. ex Kamieński]
U. peltata Spruce ex Oliv.
U. peltatifolia A.Chev. & Pellegr.
U. puberula Benj.
U. regnellii Sylvén
U. sciaphila Tutin
U. subpeltata Steyerm.
U. thomasii F.E.Lloyd & G.Taylor
U. venezuelana Steyerm.

See also 
 List of Utricularia species

References

External links

pubescens
Carnivorous plants of Africa
Carnivorous plants of Asia
Carnivorous plants of Central America
Carnivorous plants of South America
Flora of Angola
Flora of Brazil
Flora of Cameroon
Flora of Colombia
Flora of Ivory Coast
Flora of Ethiopia
Flora of Guinea
Flora of Guyana
Flora of the Indian subcontinent
Flora of Liberia
Flora of Malawi
Flora of Nigeria
Flora of Panama
Flora of Senegal
Flora of Sierra Leone
Flora of Tanzania
Flora of the Central African Republic
Flora of the Democratic Republic of the Congo
Flora of Uganda
Flora of Venezuela
Flora of Zambia
Plants described in 1819